Aknada is a rural locality (a selo) in Kizilyurtovsky District, Republic of Dagestan, Russia. The population was 4,014 as of 2010. There are 42 streets.

Geography 
Aknada is located 33 km northeast of Kizilyurt (the district's administrative centre) by road. Pyatiletka and Chalo are the nearest rural localities.

Nationalities 
Avars live there.

References 

Rural localities in Kizilyurtovsky District